Ilker Budinov (Bulgarian: Илкер Будинов; born 11 August 2000) is a Bulgarian footballer who plays as a left back or left midfielder for Pirin Blagoevgrad on loan from Ludogorets.

Career
Budinov made his professional debut for the first team on 25 September 2019 in a cup match against Neftochimic Burgas. He completed his league debut for the club on 12 July in a match against Slavia Sofia.

On 6 June 2022 Budinov was sent on loan to the newly promoted First League team Spartak Varna until the end of the season.

Career statistics

Club

References

External links
 

2000 births
Living people
Bulgarian footballers
Bulgaria youth international footballers
PFC Ludogorets Razgrad II players
PFC Ludogorets Razgrad players
PFC Spartak Varna players
First Professional Football League (Bulgaria) players
Second Professional Football League (Bulgaria) players
Association football defenders